The Government Printing Bureau ( or IO) is the publisher of Macau's government gazettes. The bureau was headquartered on Rua de Imprensa Nacional in São Lourenço (Saint Lawrence's Parish). It has recently relocated to the new multipurpose government office building in Taipa.

References

 Decreto-Lei n.º 6/97/M de 24 de Fevereiro via Imprensa Oficial

External links
  
  
 

Government departments and agencies of Macau
Government information organizations